Artem Znachkov (born January 19, 1979) is a former pair skater who competed with Maria Krasiltseva for Armenia. They teamed up in 1998 and represented Armenia at the 2002 Winter Olympics, where they placed 20th.

External links
 
 Pairs on Ice: Krasiltseva / Znachkov

1979 births
Olympic figure skaters of Armenia
Figure skaters at the 2002 Winter Olympics
Living people
People from Pervouralsk